The Express Eventing International Cup was a one-day event designed to popularise the sport of eventing.

Organised by equestrian enthusiast John Peace and former Australian international rider Stuart Buntine jointly with British Eventing, the event was first held in Cardiff's Millennium Stadium in 2008. 

The event was marred by the death of Olympian Mary King's horse Call Again Cavalier and by lack of organisation leading to an abnormally low number of finishers - 6 out of 19 competitors.

Rankings
1 Flint Curtis (O Townend, GB) 4min 25.01sec
2 Shaabrak (L Wiegersma, GB) 5:07.99
3 Ballincoola (W Fox-Pitt, GB) 5:10.72
4 Ben Along Time(C Fredericks, Aus) 5:20.02
5 Rock Model (V Panizzon, It) 5:37.08
6 Lenamore (C Powell, NZ) 6:47.25

References

External links
Express Eventing International Cup

Equestrian sports competitions in the United Kingdom
2008 in equestrian